Katharina Hacker (born 11 January 1967) is a German author best known for her award-winning novel Die Habenichtse (The Have-Nots). Hacker studied philosophy, history and Jewish studies at the University of Freiburg and the University of Jerusalem. Her studies in Israel have been seen as an attempt to compensate for the strong anti-Semitic feelings of her Silesian grandmother. She did not finish her studies with an academic degree. Since 1996, she has been living as a freelance writer in Berlin.
In 2006, she was the second writer to be awarded the German Book Prize for Die Habenichtse. In this and other works, Hacker examines the consequences of globalization and neoliberalism on the working life, social relations, and family interactions of her German protagonists.

Works

Translations

Notes

1967 births
Living people
Writers from Frankfurt
21st-century German novelists
German women novelists
21st-century German women writers
German Book Prize winners